Pui-Kuen Yeung (P.K. Yeung) from the Georgia Institute of Technology, was awarded the status of Fellow in the American Physical Society, after they were nominated by their Division of Fluid Dynamics in 2006, for "insightful contributions to the understanding and modeling of similarity scaling in turbulence and the mixing of passive scalars, especially the study of Lagrangian statistics and dispersion in turbulence through high-resolution simulations addressing Reynolds number and Schmidt number dependencies."

Education 
Yeung earned his Bachelor of Science in mechanical engineering, from the University of Hong Kong in 1980, followed by and Master of Philosophy in the year 1984. He then went on to do his PhD at Cornell University under Stephen B. Pope.  His work culminated with the publication of his thesis titled "A Study of Lagrangian Statistics in Stationary Isotropic Turbulence Using Direct Numerical Simulations"  in 1989.

References 

Fellows of the American Physical Society
American physicists
Living people
Year of birth missing (living people)